Wiesbaden-Schierstein station is a railway station in the borough of Schierstein in the Hessian state capital of Wiesbaden  on the East Rhine Railway from Wiesbaden to Cologne. It is classified by Deutsche Bahn as a category 6 station. The station was opened in 1856.

Services
Schierstein lies in the area served by the Rhein-Main-Verkehrsverbund (Rhine-Main Transport Association, RMV). It is used by StadtExpress trains operated by VIAS, and buses.

Trains
Regionalbahn services operate at hourly intervals on the Frankfurt Hauptbahnhof–Koblenz Hauptbahnhof route. In the peak hour an extra service reduces intervals to a half hour.

Buses 
The station is also served by bus line 9, which stops at the Rathaus bus stop 200 metres away.

Notes

Railway stations in Wiesbaden
Railway stations in Germany opened in 1856

de:Wiesbaden-Schierstein#Bahnhof Wiesbaden-Schierstein